Oakbourne station is a defunct railroad station on Oakburne Road in Westtown Township, Pennsylvania. Established by the Pennsylvania Railroad, it closed in 1961 and was subsequently demolished. SEPTA Regional Rail later used the line for R3 West Chester Line, but did not use the Oakbourne stop.

History
Oakbourne station was initially called Lecompton station, and later Hemphill station after a neighboring landowner, but was changed to Oakbourne when a post office was established in 1883, with Ellen Jane Speakman serving as postmistress. During the American Civil War, the station was used as a marshaling point for the neighboring Camp Elder, which housed Union prisoners captured by the Confederacy and unofficially paroled during the Battle of Gettysburg in 1863.

A post office was located in the station building until it closed in 1928, when Ellen Speakman retired. A small single-track siding served as a freight yard for the Oakbourne Epileptic Hospital and Colony Farm and other local industries. Service to the station was terminated in 1961, and the building was razed several years later.

SEPTA subsequently took over the Pennsylvania Railroad route for SEPTA Regional Rail's R3 West Chester Line. However, it did not reopen the Oakbourne stop. SEPTA discontinued regular passenger service to the line in September 1986, due to deteriorating track conditions and Chester County's desire to expand facilities at Exton station on the Paoli/Thorndale Line. The West Chester Railroad heritage railway restored the line for weekend excursions in 1997, but does not use Oakbourne station.

References

External links
West Chester Railroad's official website

Railway stations closed in 1961
Former Pennsylvania Railroad stations
Demolished railway stations in the United States
1854 establishments in Pennsylvania
1961 disestablishments in Pennsylvania

Former railway stations in Chester County, Pennsylvania
Railway stations in the United States opened in 1854